A code word is an element of a standardized code or protocol.

Code word may refer to:

 Code word (figure of speech), designed to convey a predetermined meaning to a receptive audience, while remaining inconspicuous to others

 Procedure word, in voice communication 
 Code word, an element of a codebook designed so that the meaning of the code word is opaque without the code book
 Code name, a clandestine name or cryptonym used to identify sensitive information

See also
 Brevity code
 Ten-code, brevity codes in voice communication, particularly by law enforcement and in Citizens Band
 Cipher crossword, a puzzle